This is a list of artists who were formerly signed to Cash Money Records.

References

Cash Money Records, former
Cash Money Records artists